Fibrosis, also known as fibrotic scarring, is a pathological wound healing in which connective tissue replaces normal parenchymal tissue to the extent that it goes unchecked, leading to considerable tissue remodelling and the formation of permanent scar tissue.

Repeated injuries, chronic inflammation and repair are susceptible to fibrosis where an accidental excessive accumulation of extracellular matrix components, such as the collagen is produced by fibroblasts, leading to the formation of a permanent fibrotic scar.

In response to injury, this is called scarring, and if fibrosis arises from a single cell line, this is called a fibroma. Physiologically, fibrosis acts to deposit connective tissue, which can interfere with or totally inhibit the normal architecture and function of the underlying organ or tissue. Fibrosis can be used to describe the pathological state of excess deposition of fibrous tissue, as well as the process of connective tissue deposition in healing. Defined by the pathological accumulation of extracellular matrix (ECM) proteins, fibrosis results in scarring and thickening of the affected it is in essence an exaggerated wound healing response which interferes with normal organ function.

Physiology
Fibrosis is similar to the process of scarring, in that both involve stimulated fibroblasts laying down connective tissue, including collagen and glycosaminoglycans. The process is initiated when immune cells such as macrophages release soluble factors that stimulate fibroblasts.  The most well characterized pro-fibrotic mediator is TGF beta, which is released by macrophages as well as any damaged tissue between surfaces called interstitium.   Other soluble mediators of fibrosis include CTGF, platelet-derived growth factor (PDGF), and interleukin 10 (IL-10). These initiate signal transduction pathways such as the AKT/mTOR and SMAD  pathways that ultimately lead to the proliferation and activation of fibroblasts, which deposit extracellular matrix into the surrounding connective tissue.  This process of tissue repair is a complex one, with tight regulation of extracellular matrix (ECM) synthesis and degradation ensuring maintenance of normal tissue architecture. However, the entire process, although necessary,  can lead to a progressive irreversible fibrotic response if tissue injury is severe or repetitive, or if the wound healing response itself becomes deregulated.

Anatomical location
Fibrosis can occur in many tissues within the body, typically as a result of inflammation or damage, and examples include:

Lungs 
 Fibrothorax
 Pulmonary fibrosis
 Cystic fibrosis
 Idiopathic pulmonary fibrosis (idiopathic meaning the cause is unknown)
 Radiation-induced lung injury (following treatment for cancer)

Liver 
 Bridging fibrosis An advanced stage of liver fibrosis seen in the progressive form of chronic liver diseases. The term “bridging” means ‘the formation of “bridge” (by the band of mature & thick fibrous tissue) obliterating portal area to central vein’, leads to the formation of pseudolobules. Long-term exposure to hepatotoxin (e.g. thioacetamide, carbon tetrachloride, diethylnitrosamine) results in the bridging fibrosis in experimental animal models.
 Senescence of hepatic stellate cells could prevent progression of liver fibrosis, although this has not been implemented as a therapy, and would carry the risk of hepatic dysfunction.

 Cirrhosis

Kidney 
 CYR61 induction of cellular senescence in the kidney is a potential therapy to limit fibrosis.

Brain 
 Glial scar

Heart
Myocardial fibrosis has mainly two forms:
 Interstitial fibrosis, which has been described in congestive heart failure, hypertension, and normal aging.
 Replacement fibrosis, which indicates an older myocardial infarction.

Other 
 Arterial stiffness
 Arthrofibrosis (knee, shoulder, other joints)
 Chronic kidney disease
 Crohn's disease (intestine)
 Dupuytren's contracture (hands, fingers)
 Keloid (skin)
 Mediastinal fibrosis (soft tissue of the mediastinum)
 Myelofibrosis (bone marrow)
 Peyronie's disease (penis)
 Nephrogenic systemic fibrosis (skin)
 Progressive massive fibrosis (lungs); a complication of coal workers' pneumoconiosis
 Retroperitoneal fibrosis (soft tissue of the retroperitoneum)
 Scleroderma/systemic sclerosis (skin, lungs)
 Some forms of adhesive capsulitis (shoulder)

References

External links 
 

Symptoms and signs
Medical terminology
Rheumatology
Scarring